Lal Bahadur Shastri Institute of Technology for Women (LBSITW), Thiruvananthapuram, is the first engineering college for women in the state of Kerala on the Malabar Coast of southwestern India. This is the second engineering college managed by the LBS Centre for Science and Technology, Thiruvananthapuram, Kerala the other being LBS College of Engineering, Kasargod. LBSITW is the only engineering college for women in the Government sector in the state of Kerala. The center is administered by a governing body and an executive committee. The Honorable Chief Minister is the Chairman of the governing body and the Honorable Minister of Education is the Vice-Chairman.

The institution was inaugurated on 30 Oct 2001. Approved by the AICTE and affiliated to the APJ Abdul Kalam Technological University, LBSITW is a Government of Kerala undertaking.

Prof. M Abdul Rahiman, a first batch student of LBS College of Engg Kasargod is the Principal of this institute. He is also holding the charge of Director LBS Centre for Science & Technology, parent organisation of this institute.

Location 
The college is situated in the heart of Thiruvananthapuram city at Poojapura.

References

External links
 

Engineering colleges in Thiruvananthapuram
Women's universities and colleges in Kerala
Women's engineering colleges in India
2001 establishments in Kerala
Educational institutions established in 2001